Thomas Archdeacon may refer to:
Thomas Archdeacon (senior), MP
Thomas Archdeacon (junior), MP for Devon in 1420
Thomas J. Archdeacon, American historian